Bonnie Sveen (born 14 July 1989) is an Australian actress. She began her acting career at the Huon Valley Theatre Company, before attending the National Institute of Dramatic Art. In 2010, Sveen starred in the multi-story drama film Before the Rain and made a guest appearance in the soap opera Home and Away. In 2013, Sveen appeared as the freed slave Chadara in Spartacus: Vengeance. Sveen also joined the main cast of Home and Away as Ricky Sharpe. For her portrayal of Ricky, Sveen won the Logie Award for Most Popular New Talent. Sveen appeared as Ricky in the 2015 spin-off Home and Away: An Eye for an Eye. The following year, she announced her departure from Home and Away, after she was cast in the Seven Network drama The Secret Daughter, alongside Jessica Mauboy.

Early and personal life
Sveen was born in the Huon Valley, South Tasmania to Rob and Leanne Sveen. She has two brothers, one older and one younger. Sveen began her acting career at the Huon Valley Theatre Company. She attended Rosny College, before she moved to Sydney to attend the National Institute of Dramatic Art (NIDA).

Outside of acting, Sveen is also a painter. Sveen has been in a relationship with assistant director Nathan Gooley since 2015. In August 2018, Sveen announced that the couple were expecting identical twins in October. However, Sveen gave birth to the twin girls a month early.

Career
In 2010, Sveen starred as Violet in a chapter of the multi-story Australian film Before the Rain. The chapter, titled Violet, was written by Alice Bell and directed by Craig Boreham. Before the Rain was a co-production from NIDA and the Australian Film, Television and Radio School. In that same year, Sveen also made a guest appearance as Hayley Doven in two episodes of Home and Away. In 2013, Sveen appeared as Chadara in Spartacus: Vengeance.

Sveen auditioned for the role of Bianca Scott in Home and Away, before she was cast as Ricky Sharpe. Sveen told Tim Martain from The Mercury that she wanted the part "more than anything I've ever auditioned for." Ricky was introduced as a love interest for established character Darryl Braxton (Steve Peacocke). Sveen made her first appearance as Ricky on 2 April 2013. Sveen won the Logie Award for Most Popular New Talent for the role. Her acceptance speech was praised by the media and viewers after she spoke about positive body images and acknowledged Indigenous Australians as the original owners of the land where the Logies were held. In 2015, Sveen also starred in the spin-off episode Home and Away: An Eye for an Eye broadcast exclusively on the subscription service Presto.

In early April 2016, it was announced Sveen had joined the cast of The Secret Daughter alongside singer Jessica Mauboy, who encouraged producers to sign her for the show. Sveen plays the role of back-up singer Layla, while Mauboy plays Billie, a singer who goes to the city to pursue her music dreams, but finds out about her family's past at the same time. Sveen dyed her hair brunette for the role. A few days later, Sveen confirmed that she had left Home and Away. She posted a goodbye message on her social media account, stating "If someone had told me 10 years ago that I'd be playing a staunch, surfie chick in Summer Bay (and that it would bring me more joy than I could imagine) I wouldn't have believed them. Playing Ricky has shaped me for ever. I carry every bond that was forged and so many fond memories, into the new beginning."

Filmography

Awards and nominations

References

External links

21st-century Australian actresses
People from Tasmania
Actresses from Tasmania
Australian film actresses
Australian soap opera actresses
Living people
Logie Award winners
National Institute of Dramatic Art alumni
1989 births